The Neureuth is a  mountain in the Bavarian Prealps east of Lake Tegernsee in Bavaria, Germany. It is a popular destination for the citizens of Munich. The summit with the much-visited Neureuth Inn can be reached by an easy hike from the town Tegernsee or from the village Gasse (Gmund am Tegernsee). Even in winter the Neureuth is accessible without special equipment. The Neureuth Inn operates all year round. Alternatively, one can also descend on the  Gindelalmschneid and Gindelalm to Schliersee.

References

Mountains of Bavaria
Mountains of the Alps